Villages in Bhutan are made up of groups of individual settlements, grouped together by chiwog for election purposes. Village populations vary widely, from dozens to hundreds. Generally, greater numbers of villages within chiwogs indicate lower populations in the vast majority of those villages.

Villages in Bhutan are governed directly by Gewog (village block) governments, which in turn are subordinate to Dzongkhag (district) or Dungkhag (sub-district) governments. Villages in Bhutan may be distinguished from Thromdes (municipalities), which are larger settlements not part of any Chiwog, and which may be self-governing under the Local Government Act of Bhutan 2009. This Act also provides for the redrawing of chiwog borders and regrouping of villages by the Demarcation Commission in order to define relatively equally populated single member constituencies. Village and chiwog demarcations, therefore, are subject to considerable change.

Many village names are recurring, and may be shared even among neighboring settlements. Sometimes this indicates a large village spread among more than one chiwog. Geographical names frequently include: wom (Dzongkha: འོགམ་; "lower"), gom (སྒོངམ་; "upper/higher"), (kha)toed (སྟོད་; "upper [valley]"), (kha)maed (སྨད་; "lower [valley]"), nang (ནང་; "inner"), -gang (སྒང་; "hilltop, ridge"), -ling (གླིང་; "place"), -la (ལ་; "mountain pass"), -thang (ཐང་; "valley"), -pelri (དཔལ་རི་; "mountain"), -chhu (ཆུ་; "river"), and -dey (སྡེ་; "part, section"). Popular name parts also include choekhor (ཆོས་འཁོར་; "dharma wheel"), dekid (བདེ་སྐྱིད་; "peace"), phel (འཕེལ་; "flourish"), phuen (ཕུན་; "complete, perfect, wonderful"), tashi (བཀྲ་ཤིས་/བཀྲིས་; "auspicious"), goenpa (དགོན་པ་; "monastery"), lhakhang (ལྷ་ཁང་ "temple"), pema (པདྨ་; "lotus"), and norbu (ནོར་བུ་; "jewel"). Spelling variations are frequent; in government documents certain transliterations are equivalent: "oo" and "u;" "ay" and "ey;" and in some circumstances, "a" and "e."

List of villages 
.

The following are lists of villages in Bhutan by District as of 2011. Slashes indicate names combined names and disambiguations. Parenthetical names are alternative designations and may reflect a Nepali name.

Bumthang District

Chukha District

Dagana District

Gasa District

Haa District

Lhuntse District

Mongar District

Paro District

Pemagatshel District

Punakha District

Samdrup Jongkhar District

Samtse District

Sarpang District

Thimphu District

Trashigang District

Trashiyangtse District

Trongsa District

Tsirang District

Wangdue Phodrang District

Zhemgang District

Table notes

See also
Thromde (municipality)
Chiwog 
Gewog (village block)
Dungkhag (sub-district)
Dzongkhag (district)
List of cities, towns and villages in Bhutan
List of cities in Bhutan

References

Bhutan